(born November 5, 1980) is a Japanese cross-country skier who has competed since 1998. Her best World Cup finish was third in the 30 km event in Norway in 2009.

Competing in five Winter Olympics, Ishida earned her best finish of fifth in the 30 km event at Vancouver in 2010. She competed at the 2022 Winter Olympics, in Women's 10 kilometre classical, Women's 30 kilometre freestyle, Women's 15 kilometre skiathlon, and Women's 4 × 5 kilometre relay.

Her best finish at the FIS Nordic World Ski Championships was fourth in the team sprint event at Liberec in 2009.

Cross-country skiing results
All results are sourced from the International Ski Federation (FIS).

Olympic Games

World Championships

World Cup

Season standings

Individual podiums

2 podiums  – (2 )

References

External links
 
 
 

1980 births
Cross-country skiers at the 2006 Winter Olympics
Cross-country skiers at the 2010 Winter Olympics
Cross-country skiers at the 2014 Winter Olympics
Cross-country skiers at the 2018 Winter Olympics
Cross-country skiers at the 2022 Winter Olympics
Japanese female cross-country skiers
Living people
Olympic cross-country skiers of Japan
People from Hokkaido
Asian Games medalists in cross-country skiing
Cross-country skiers at the 2007 Asian Winter Games
Cross-country skiers at the 2011 Asian Winter Games
Asian Games gold medalists for Japan
Asian Games silver medalists for Japan
Asian Games bronze medalists for Japan
Medalists at the 2007 Asian Winter Games
Medalists at the 2011 Asian Winter Games
Tour de Ski skiers